No. 107 Helicopter Unit (Desert Hawks) is a Helicopter Unit and is equipped with Mil Mi-8.

History

Assignments
Operation Pawan

Aircraft
S-62
Mi-8/8T

References

107